The Navigator is an epithet which may refer to:

Brendan (c. 484–c. 577), Irish monastic saint 
Hanno the Navigator, Carthaginian explorer c. 500 BC and nominal king of Carthage from 480 to 440 BC
Prince Henry the Navigator (1394-1460), an important figure in Portuguese explorations

Lists of people by epithet